Cannibal is a 2013 thriller film directed by Manuel Martín Cuenca. It was screened in the Special Presentation section at the 2013 Toronto International Film Festival. An international co-production among companies from Spain, Romania, Russia and France, the film was produced by La Loma Blanca PC, MOD Producciones, Libra Film, CTB Film Company LTD and Luminor. Penned by Martín Cuenca and Alejandro Hernández, the screenplay is inspired by Humberto Arenal's novel Caríbal.

Plot
Carlos is a soft-spoken tailor that hides a secret double life as a serial killer. He stalks his prey carefully and carts them off to a remote mountain cabin where he slices them up and takes a bit of their meat home with him to devour later at his convenience. Carlos otherwise lives his life uneventfully until his path crosses with the beautiful Alexandra, who tries to spark off a relationship with him. Shortly thereafter, Alexandra goes missing and Carlos is contacted by Alexandra's twin sister Nina, who believes that Alexandra ran off after stealing money from their parents. Carlos offers to help Nina to a degree that makes her instantly suspicious, but she decides to stay with him because Alexandra's brutish boyfriend is causing trouble. As the film progresses, Carlos finds himself becoming drawn to Nina and eventually he offers to take her to his remote cabin. He decides that he will drug and murder her, but finds himself incapable of performing the task. Carlos tries to confess that he's murdered not only Nina's sister, but also multiple other women and was going to murder Nina as well, but she refuses to believe him. However, as they drive down the mountainside together, Nina deliberately causes a car accident in order to kill them both.

Cast
 Antonio de la Torre as Carlos
 María Alfonsa Rosso as Aurora
 Olimpia Melinte as Nina / Alexandra
 Joaquín Núñez
 Gregory Brossard as Boyfriend

Reception
Critical reception for Cannibal has been mixed. The movie currently holds a 67% approval rating at Rotten Tomatoes based on 15 reviews, with an average rating of 6.1/10. Variety gave a favorable review for Cannibal, writing "Sumptuously shot in carefully composed long takes, the film firmly keeps its butchery offscreen, and given its glacial pace and lack of overt sensationalism, it definitely ranks as a niche item — and a rarefied one, at that. But sophisticated arthouse audiences might eat it up."

In September 2014, the film won the Meliès d’Argent for the best European fantastic film at the Strasbourg European Fantastic Film Festival.

References

External links
 

2013 films
2013 thriller films
2013 multilingual films
2010s serial killer films
2010s Spanish-language films
Spanish thriller films
Romanian thriller films
2010s Romanian-language films
Spanish multilingual films
Romanian multilingual films
Films about cannibalism
MOD Producciones films
Films based on Cuban novels